Islamnur Magomedrasulovich Abdulavov (born 7 March 1994) is a Russian professional football player.

Early life 
Islamnur was born in the village of Paraul, Dagestan, to a Kumyk family.

Club career
He made his debut in the Russian Premier League on 17 August 2013 for FC Anzhi Makhachkala in a game against FC Zenit St. Petersburg.

Abdulavov joined Premier League side FC Ufa but after failing to feature regularly at the club, he was sent out on loan to FNL sides FC Tom Tomsk and FC Rotor Volgograd. Abdulavov scored just one goal in 20 league appearances for Rotor, and he refused to join the club's second team, FC Rotor-2 Volgograd, so Ufa recalled him at the beginning of February 2019.

On 8 February 2019, Abdulavov signed with FC Tom Tomsk until the end of the 2018–19 season.

On 3 July 2019, Abdulavov signed with FC Atyrau, scoring on his debut against FC Zhetysu on 6 July 2019.

Career statistics

Club

Notes

References

External links
 
 
 

1994 births
Living people
Footballers from Makhachkala
Russian people of Dagestani descent
Russian footballers
Russian expatriate footballers
Association football forwards
FC Anzhi Makhachkala players
FC Ufa players
FC Tom Tomsk players
FC Rotor Volgograd players
FC Atyrau players
FC Okzhetpes players
Russian Premier League players
Kazakhstan Premier League players
Russian expatriate sportspeople in Kazakhstan
Expatriate footballers in Kazakhstan